Arco Jochemsen (born 21 February 1971) is a retired Dutch football striker.

Honours
Utrecht
KNVB Cup: 2002–03

References

1971 births
Living people
Dutch footballers
SBV Vitesse players
Feyenoord players
FC Utrecht players
FC Twente players
PEC Zwolle players
Association football forwards
Eredivisie players
Eerste Divisie players